Hub Drama First (formerly known as TVB First) is a Hong Kong drama channel co-established by TVBI and StarHub. While broadcasting the newest HK drama on the same time HK does, it also plays TVB dramas that are firstly released overseas. This channel was officially launched on 2 June 2014.

See also
StarHub TV
VV Drama
Sensasi
E City

External links
 Starhub CableTV programme guide

References

Television stations in Singapore
Television channels and stations established in 2014